The Defence Estate and Infrastructure Group (abbreviated as E&IG) is the infrastructure and service delivery organisation of the Australian Department of Defence responsible for environmental stewardship, land management and facilities maintenance of the Australian Defence Force. The Group is led by the Deputy Secretary for Estate and Infrastructure.

History
The agency's name was changed from Defence Support and Reform Group (DSRG) to Defence Estate and Infrastructure Group on 1 July 2015.

Role and responsibilities
The Defence Estate and Infrastructure Group which oversees a budget in excess of $3 billion, with an asset base with a gross replacement value in excess of $62 billion and around 2,100 civilian and 550 military staff. The Defence Estate and Infrastructure Group also maintains environmental stewardship of over 3 million hectares of land with more than 300 managed properties and maintains and operates more than 25,000 buildings.

Organisational structure

Infrastructure Division
Capital Facilities and Infrastructure Branch 
Environment and Engineering Branch
Estate Planning Branch
Property Management Branch

Service Delivery Division
Regional Services Branch 
Estate Service Delivery Branch 
Service Delivery Program Management and Governance Branch

See also 
 Department of Infrastructure, Regional Development and Cities

References

External links
 Official Defence Estate and Infrastructure Group website

Defence estate management agencies
Australian Defence Force
Leadership of the Australian Defence Force
Defence agencies of Australia